Theosophical teachings have borrowed some concepts and terms from Buddhism. Some theosophists like Helena Blavatsky, Helena Roerich and Henry Steel Olcott also became Buddhists. Henry Steel Olcott helped shape the design of the Buddhist flag. Tibetan Buddhism was popularised in the West at first mainly by Theosophists including Evans-Wentz and Alexandra David-Neel.

Blavatsky sometimes compared Theosophy to Mahayana Buddhism. In The Key to Theosophy she writes:

The Theosophists as Buddhists and Buddhologists

The Founders of the Theosophical Society 
25 May 1880 Blavatsky and Olcott embraced Buddhism: they publicly took in Galle the Refuges and Pancasila from a prominent Sinhalese bhikkhu. Olcott and Blavatsky (she received US citizenship previously) were the first Americans who were converted to Buddhism in the traditional sense.

In Buddhology there is an idea that the "Theosophical Buddhists" were the forerunners of all subsequent Western, or, as they were called, "white" Buddhists. In addition, they attempted to rationalize Buddhism, to cleanse the doctrine, removing from it elements of "folk superstition". They also tried to identify Buddhism with esoteric doctrine, recognizing the Lord Buddha as the "Master-Adept." And finally, they considered it their duty to provide assistance and political support to the oppressed Sinhalese Buddhists.

 Theosophical revival of Buddhism

In 1880 Olcott began to build up the Buddhist Educational Movement in Ceylon. In 1880 there were only two schools in Ceylon managed by the Buddhists. Due to the efforts of Olcott the number rose to 205 schools and four colleges in 1907 (Ananda College in Colombo, Mahinda College in Galle, Dharmaraja College in Kandy and Maliyadeva College in Kurunegala). Thus began the great Buddhist revival in Ceylon.   Olcott also represented the Buddhist cause to the British government, and found redress for the restrictions imposed against Buddhists, such as the prohibition of processions, Buddhist schools, the improved financial administration of temple properties, and so on.

Olcott "united the sects of Ceylon in the Buddhist Section of the Theosophical Society (1880); the 12 sects of Japan into a Joint Committee for the promotion of Buddhism (1889); Burma, Siam, and Ceylon into a Convention of Southern Buddhists (1891); and finally Northern and Southern Buddhism through joint signatures to his Fourteen Propositions of Buddhism (1891)."

Anagarika Dharmapala 
An important part of Olcott's work in Ceylon became the patronage of young Buddhist Don David Hewavitharana, who took himself later name Anagarika Dharmapala. Dharmapala, a founder the Maha Bodhi Society, Sri Lanka's national hero, was one of the major figures in the movement for the revival of Buddhism in Ceylon during the British colonial rule.

In December 1884 Blavatsky, accompanied by Leadbeater and the marrieds Cooper-Oakley came to Ceylon. Leadbeater, following the example of the leaders of the Theosophical Society, has officially become a Buddhist, without renouncing Christianity (he was an Anglican priest). David joined the Blavatsky's team to go to India.

Upon arrival in India Dharmapala as a member of the Theosophical Society worked with Blavatsky and Olcott. They advised him to devote himself to the service of "the benefit of mankind," and begin to study Pali and the Buddhist philosophy. Sangharakshita wrote that at the age of 20 years Dharmapala was equally fascinated by both Buddhism and theosophy.

After returning from India, Dharmapala worked in Colombo as general secretary of the Buddhist section of the Theosophical Society, and as director of the Buddhist press. In 1886, he was a translator, when together with Olcott and Leadbeater made a lecture tour of the island. He helped Olcott in a work on the organization of Buddhist schools. When Olcott instructed Leadbeater to prepare a shortened version of the Buddhist Catechism, Dharmapala undertook to translate it to Sinhala. Work of Dharmapala and theosophists contributed to the revival of Buddhism in Sri Lanka and other countries of the Southern Buddhism.

Leadbeater has initiated the organization in various parts of Colombo a large number of Buddhist Sunday schools. He also founded an English school, which later became known as Ananda College (one of the most famous schools of Ceylon). Among the pupils of this school was a young Buddhist Jinarajadasa, who later worked as the fourth President of the Theosophical Society Adyar.

In 1893, Dharmapala went to the West, first to England and then to the Chicago, where he represented Buddhism at the World Parliament of Religions. Although he was only 29 years old, he was the most famous representative of Buddhism in parliament. At the conference, he made several appearances on three main themes. Firstly, he said that Buddhism is a religion, which perfectly consistent with modern science, because the Buddhist teachings are completely compatible with the doctrine of evolution. He outlined the Buddhist idea that the cosmos is a sequential process of deployment in accordance with the laws of nature. Secondly, Dharmapala said that in the ethics of Buddhism is much more love and compassion than in the sermons of Christian missionaries working in Ceylon. By a third paragraph of his performances was the assertion that Buddhism is a religion of optimism and activity, but in any case not of pessimism and inactivity.

Christmas Humphreys 
In 1924 in London Humphreys founded the Buddhist Lodge of the Theosophical Society. According to Humphreys, conceptually the Theosophy and Buddhism are identical: the single life after many incarnations returns to the Unmanifest; all the individual consciousness are unreal compared to the "Self", which is a reflection of the Absolute; karma and reincarnation are a basic laws. Path lays through self-fulfillment with Nirvana in the end. Thus, wrote Humphreys, the difference between the Theosophy and Buddhism is only in emphasis.

Thanks to the missionary efforts of Dharmapala, in 1926 the British Buddhists established their branch Maha Bodhi Society. At the same time the Buddhist Lodge was transformed into the British Buddhist Society, whose president become Humphreys. Humphreys was a tireless lay Buddhist as a lecturer, journalist, writer and organizer. He was the author and/or the editor of The Buddhist Lodge Monthly Bulletin, Buddhism in England, The Middle Way, and The Theosophical Review.

Watts and Conze 
British philosopher and Buddhist author Alan Watts became a member of the Buddhist Lodge of the Theosophical Society in London at the age of 15. His first book, The Spirit of Zen came out when he was 19 years old.

Another active member of the Theosophical Society was Edward Conze, who later became a famous buddhologist.

D. Suzuki and B. Suzuki 
The famous Buddhist philosopher and popularizer of Zen D. T. Suzuki and his wife Beatrice Suzuki became members of the Theosophical Society in Tokyo in 1920; their names appear on the list of Theosophical Society members sent to Adyar on 12 May 1920. After moving to Kyoto in 1924, the Suzukis formed a new branch of the Theosophical Society called the Mahayana Lodge. Most of the Lodge members were university professors. In 1937 Jinarajadasa, future president of the Theosophical Society, read two lectures in Tokyo which were translated into Japanese by D. T. Suzuki.

Analysis of the theosophical texts
According to buddhologists Reigle and Taylor, Blavatsky herself, and her immediate Masters, and the Master of her Masters were Buddhists by faith and lexis, who were strongly associated by relationships "pupil-teacher". Blavatsky often uses in her works the references to Buddhism, in particular, to the Mahayana teachings, while in the "mahatma letters" Buddhism is present on virtually every page, and it is immediately evident from the frequent use of specific terminology on the Sanskrit, Pali, Tibetan, Chinese and Mongolian languages.

The Mahatma letters 
Humphreys wrote that theosophists got their knowledge from two Masters who prepared Blavatsky for her mission in the world. Their letters were published later, in 1923: it was a book The Mahatma Letters to A. P. Sinnett. He noted that the founders of the theosophical movement, Blavatsky and Olcott, publicly declared themselves Buddhists and, more important still, the two Masters, who founded the Theosophical movement, spoke: "Our Great Patron is the Teacher of Nirvana and the Law." And their Master, the Maha-Chohan, once said, describing himself and his fellow-adepts, that they were all "the devoted followers of the spirit incarnate of absolute self-sacrifice, of philanthropy, divine kindness, as of all the highest virtues attainable on this earth of sorrow, the man of men, Gautama Buddha." Speaking about Buddha, Humphries repeatedly quoted the Master Kuthumi, for example:
 "Our great Buddha—the patron of all the adepts, the reformer and the codifier of the occult system."
 "In our temples there is neither a god nor gods worshipped, only the thrice sacred memory of the greatest as the holiest man that ever lived."
Humphreys stated: "All who dare to call themselves Theosophists or Buddhists must study, and teach and strive to apply this garnered Wisdom."

The Secret Doctrine and the Books of Kiu-te 
Oldmeadow wrote that Blavatsky's second major work, The Secret Doctrine, includes elements that clearly derive from the Vajrayana, often conflated with Vedantic ideas. He noted: "Lama Kazi Dawa Samdup was sufficiently confident of Blavatsky's account of the Bardo to endorse her claim that she had been initiated into 'the higher lamaistic teachings'."

Lama Kazi Dawa Samdup (a translator of The Tibetan Book of the Dead) believed that Blavatsky had "intimate acquaintance with the higher lamaistic teachings".

Humphreys in his autobiography praised The Secret Doctrine. At the time he published an abridgment of this book.

Blavatsky claimed to have access to a popularised version of Buddhist secret doctrines, a fourteen volume esoteric commentary, "worked out from one small archaic folio, the Book of the Secret Wisdom of the World", as well as secret texts she termed Kiu-Te. Buddhologist David Reigle identified Blavatsky's "Books of Kiu-te" as the Tantra section of the Tibetan Buddhist canon.

The Voice of the Silence 
Zen Buddhism scholar D. T. Suzuki wrote about Blavatsky's book The Voice of the Silence: "Undoubtedly Madame Blavatsky had in some way been initiated into the deeper side of Mahayana teaching and then gave out what she deemed wise to the Western world." He also commented: "Here is the real Mahayana Buddhism."

In 1927 the staff of the 9th Panchen Lama Tub-ten Cho-gyi Nyima helped Theosophists put out the "Peking Edition" of The Voice of the Silence.

The 14th Dalai Lama Tenzin Gyatso wrote in the preface to the 1989 Centenary edition of The Voice of the Silence, "I believe that this book has strongly influenced many sincere seekers and aspirants to the wisdom and compassion of the Bodhisattva Path."

Humphreys wrote: "The Buddhists and Theosophists of the West, all converts, be it noted, from some other faith, have much in common: The Voice of the Silence ('a pure Buddhist work', as the late Anagarika Dharmapala of Ceylon wrote to me, and the Dalai Lama signed my copy long ago) and Colonel Olcott's Buddhist Catechism."

According to Kalnitsky, the contents of The Voice of the Silence reflects "authentic Buddhist sentiment, even if not universally acknowledged as a pure Buddhist historical document."

Esoteric Buddhism 
According to Lopez, the author of Esoteric Buddhism "has a broader view of the Buddha" than that of Western Buddhologists and scholars of Oriental studies. Sinnett stated that the Buddha is simply one of a row "of adepts who have appeared over the course of the centuries." Buddha's next incarnation happened approximately sixty years after his death. He appeared as Shankara, the well-known Vedantic philosopher. Sinnett noted that for the uninitiated it is known that date of Shankara's birth is one thousand years after Buddha's death, and that he was hostile to Buddhism. Sinnett wrote that the Buddha came as Shankara "to fill up some gaps and repair certain errors in his own previous teaching." The Buddha had departed "from the practice of earlier adepts by opening the path" to adeptship to men of all castes. "Although well intentioned, this led" to a deterioration of occult knowledge when it was penetrated into ignominious hands. Sinnett wrote that to further appeared a need "to take no candidates except from the class which, on the whole, by reason of its hereditary advantages, is likely to be the best nursery of fit candidates."Sinnett claimed that the  Buddha's next incarnation was as the great Tibetan adept reformer of the 14th century Tsong-ka-pa.

Criticism 
The existence of a hidden or esoteric teaching in Buddhism is not accepted by Theravadin Buddhists. For example, Rhys Davids wrote:
"In this connection I shall doubtless be expected to say a few words on Theosophy, if only because one of the books giving an account of that very curious and widely spread movement has been called Esoteric Buddhism. It has always been a point of wonder to me why the author should have chosen this particular title for his treatise. For if there is anything that can be said with absolute certainty about the book it is, that it is not esoteric, and not Buddhism. The original Buddhism was the very contrary of esoteric."

Guénon believed that Blavatskyan "theosophism" is a "confused mixture" of Neoplatonism, Gnosticism, Jewish Kabbalah, Hermeticism, and occultism. He wrote: "From the start this heteroclite mixture was presented as 'esoteric Buddhism'; but since it was still too easy to see that it presented only very vague relationships with true Buddhism."

Oldmeadow claimed:"Despite the legend which she and her hagiographers propagated, Blavatsky never stepped on Tibetan soil. Her claims that her later writings derived from Himalayan Mahatmas, forming a kind of Atlantean brotherhood residing in secrecy in a remote region of Tibet and with access to longhidden, antediluvian sources of esoteric wisdom, need not be treated seriously."

In 2015 Uditha Devapriya stated that Olcott's Buddhist Catechism was based on the Catholic Catechism, and his schools were by same institutions which he criticised: "This meant that the Buddhism he 'founded' was not the sort of Buddhism which Gunananda Thero began a journey to find."

See also
 Buddhism and science
 Buddhist modernism
 Christianity and Theosophy
 Esoteric Buddhism
 "Is Theosophy a Religion?"
 Theosophy and literature
 Roerichism
 Theosophy and Hinduism
 Theosophy and Western philosophy
 Vipassana movement
 "What Is Theosophy?"

References

Notes

Citations

Sources

Further reading

 

Theosophy
Buddhism